Sadanand Date (born December 14, 1966) is an officer of 1990 batch of Indian Police Service (IPS). He has held several important posts at both state and national levels of the IPS, including serving as deputy inspector general of police in the Central Bureau of Investigation (CBI). He gained a doctorate from Pune University (in his home town), having previously done postgraduate work in commerce. Date is also a qualified cost and management accountant from Institute of Cost Accountants of India He attended the University of Minnesota under the Humphrey fellowship program, where he studied the theoretical and practical aspects of controlling white-collar and organized crime in the United States. On his return to India he was posted as additional commissioner of police (economic offences wing). He was awarded the President's medal in 2007. Presently he is the Commissioner of police for Mira-Bhayandar and Vasai-Virar city near Mumbai.

Mumbai attacks 
Date was wounded and attracted international attention during the November 2008 Mumbai attacks because of his actions resisting terrorists at the Cama and Albless Hospital for women and children. Date was awarded the President's Police Medal for Gallantry for saving lives of women and children at Cama Hospital on 26/11/2008.

See also 
 Gajendra Singh (NSG commando)
 Sandeep Unnikrishnan
 November 2008 Mumbai attacks

References

External links 
 Humphrey Fellows — bios of fellows, including Sadanand Date, from the official University of Minnesota website
 Research Newsletter — abstract of Sadanand Date's PhD research (page 2 of 2)

1966 births
Living people
University of Minnesota alumni
Victims of the 2008 Mumbai attacks
Police officers from Mumbai